Philometra fasciati is a species of parasitic nematode of fishes, first found off New Caledonia in the South Pacific, in the gonads Epinephelus fasciatus. This species is characterized mainly by: length of spicules and length and structure of its gubernaculum; structure of male caudal end; body size; location in host and types of hosts.

References

Further reading

 

Camallanida
Parasitic nematodes of fish
Nematodes described in 2008